Run Devil Run is the eleventh solo studio album by Paul McCartney, released in 1999. It features mostly covers of both familiar and obscure 1950s rock and roll songs, along with three original McCartney compositions written in the same style, including the title track, making it the second McCartney covers album, after his Russian cover album. As his first project following first wife Linda's death in 1998, McCartney felt the need to get back to his roots and perform some of the music he loved as a teenager. On 14 December 1999, McCartney returned to the Cavern Club stage to play a set publicising the new album.

Background
Following the death of his wife Linda McCartney in April 1998, Paul McCartney had a year of mourning. Wanting to keep things fresh, a lesson he had learned from his experiences working on The Beatles Anthology project and put to use on Flaming Pie, McCartney planned to cut the album as quickly as possible, much in the way the Beatles had recorded in their early years. Asking Chris Thomas to help produce, McCartney booked time at Abbey Road Studios to undertake his quest.

Music and lyrics
The album consists of 12 cover versions of rock and roll songs and three McCartney originals. Of the covers, "Blue Jean Bop" was written and recorded by Gene Vincent in 1956. "She Said Yeah" had been recorded by Larry Williams. "All Shook Up", "I Got Stung" and "Party" had been recorded by Elvis Presley. "No Other Baby" was written by Dickie Bishop and Bob Watson, and was originally recorded in 1958 by skiffle group the Vipers and released as a single. Despite never owning a copy of the song, it had made a big enough imprint on McCartney for him to record it 40 years on. "Lonesome Town" had been recorded by Ricky Nelson. "Movie Magg" had been recorded by Carl Perkins. Chuck Berry's composition "Brown Eyed Handsome Man" had been recorded by him and by Buddy Holly whose version McCartney liked.  "Shake a Hand" was written by Joe Morris and recorded by Little Richard in 1956  "Coquette" had been recorded by Fats Domino. "Honey Hush" had been first recorded by Joe Turner though the liner notes state that McCartney was more familiar with the version by Johnny Burnette.

Of the originals "Run Devil Run" is a song in the Chuck Berry style, "Try Not to Cry" was recounting a widower's suffering. and "What It Is" had been started a few months prior to Linda's death.

Recording and structure

Wanting to work with reliable and empathetic musicians, McCartney called up Pink Floyd's David Gilmour to play guitar. Also recruited were guitarist Mick Green, keyboardists Pete Wingfield and Geraint Watkins, and on drums Deep Purple's Ian Paice and Dave Mattacks. McCartney played bass although he did play electric guitar in some instances. McCartney wanted the sessions to be laid back, with no post-production. McCartney had brought a list of material that he wished to play, the songs being early rock and roll songs from his childhood and a few originals he had written in a similar style. The initial sessions were a week in early March, with a few more sessions done in April and May, and then the album—featuring three new McCartney songs among the old classics—was complete. Thomas thought it a "cathartic" exercise for McCartney, calling it the "this is for Linda album".

Release
Released on 4 October 1999 in the UK, and a day later in the US, reaching number 12 in the UK and number 27 in the US. The title Run Devil Run was inspired by Miller's Rexall Drugs, a hoodoo and herbal medicine shop in South Downtown Atlanta with products by that very name. It appealed to McCartney as a great title for a rock and roll song, which he duly composed. The store was located at 87 Broad Street in Atlanta, Georgia.

To stimulate sales, a number of different bonus discs and singles were issued to accompany the album. Two special editions of Run Devil Run with limited-edition bonus discs were available only at certain retailers. A special limited edition of the album, sold only at Best Buy, featured a bonus interview disc. A similar special limited edition of the album, sold only at Musicland and Sam Goody stores, featured a four-track E.P. that contained the original artists' versions of four songs on the album: "Blue Jean Bop" by Gene Vincent & His Blue Caps, "Lonesome Town" by Ricky Nelson, "Coquette" by Fats Domino, and "Let's Have a Party" by Wanda Jackson. 
Also, in the UK, all fifteen songs on the album, along with "Fabulous", were released on 25 December 1999, as set of eight 7-inch singles sold together in a Run Devil Run Limited Edition Collector's Box designed to look like a record case from the 1950s.

"No Other Baby" was released as a 7" vinyl single in the UK with two songs on the B-side, "Brown Eyed Handsome Man" and a non-album track "Fabulous". In America, "No Other Baby" was released on a special juke-box single, with "Try Not to Cry" included as the B-side. "No Other Baby", "Brown Eyed Handsome Man" and "Fabulous" were released together on two different CD singles, one of which contained stereo versions of the three songs and the other of which contained mono versions of the three songs. The music video for "No Other Baby", which was filmed in black and white, highlights McCartney's grief after Linda's death.

McCartney filmed a performance at the Cavern Club as part of promotion for the album, on 14 December 1999. This performance was eventually released as a video Live at the Cavern Club.

Reception

On release, Run Devil Run received several highly favourable reviews. McCartney biographer Peter Ames Carlin said that despite the rock and roll songs being written by others, the album was "the most deeply autobiographical album of Paul's career". Rhapsody praised the work, calling it one of their favourite cover albums.

Track listing

Notes
 In 2007, upon adding McCartney's catalogue of music, the iTunes Store added his cover of the Charlie Gracie song, "Fabulous", as an exclusive digital bonus track on this album.
"Fabulous" was also released as the B-side on the "No Other Baby" single.

Personnel
Personnel per booklet.

Paul McCartney – vocals, bass guitar, electric guitar, percussion, acoustic guitar
David Gilmour – electric guitar, backing vocals, lap steel guitar
Mick Green – electric guitar
Ian Paice – drums, percussion
Pete Wingfield – keyboards, piano, Hammond organ
Dave Mattacks – drums, percussion
Geraint Watkins – piano
Chris Hall – accordion

Production
Chris Thomas, Paul McCartney – producers
Geoff Emerick, Paul Hicks – engineer
Steve Rooke – mastering
Dave Fine – cover photos
Richard Haughton – Paul photo
Mike McCartney – young Paul photo
John Hammel – session photos
Mike Owen – products photo
Philip Gallard – instrument photos
Klaus Voormann, Aleen Toroyan – drawings
Norman Hathaway – design

Charts

Weekly charts

Year-end charts

Certifications and sales

References
Footnotes

 Citations

Sources

External links

 JPGR's Beatles site: Paul McCartney's Run Devil Run

1999 albums
Paul McCartney albums
Parlophone albums
Capitol Records albums
History of Atlanta
Albums produced by Paul McCartney
Albums produced by Chris Thomas (record producer)
Albums with cover art by Klaus Voormann
British rock-and-roll albums
Covers albums